The Réseau de la Woëvre was a  long metre-gauge rail network that operated from 1914 to 1938 in France. A  branch line to Commercy branched off from the 61 km Verdun-Montmédy main line at Vaux-devant-Damloup.

History 
The network operator of the Réseau de la Woëvre was granted a concession for non-profit operation by a law of 13 June 1907, and began operating it in 1914.</ref>

The Société Générale des Chemins de Fer Économiques (SE) took over the operation in 1922. The company had opened its own network in 1914, shortly before the start of the First World War.

Route 

There were four sections:

 Metre gauge
 Verdun - Vaux-devant-Damloup - Montmédy (61 km), opened in 1914, closed in 1938
Vaux-devant-Damloup - Commercy (66 km), opened 1914, closed 1938
Standard gauge
Robert-Espagne - Haironville (11 km), opened 1933, closed 1971
Aubréville - Varenne-en-Argonne (11 km), opened in 1918, closed in 1937

Stations and bridges

References 

Metre gauge railways in France
Railway lines in Grand Est